The Ilz is a river running through the Bavarian Forest, Germany.

The Ilz is formed at the confluence of its source rivers Große Ohe and Kleine Ohe in Eberhardsreuth. In the city of Passau it finally enters the Danube. Another town on the Ilz is Fürsteneck.

See also
List of rivers of Bavaria

References

External links 
 Ilz river 

Rivers of Bavaria
Protected landscapes in Germany
Freyung-Grafenau
Passau (district)
Rivers of Germany